This page shows the results of the Weightlifting Competition at the 1995 Pan American Games, held from March 11 to March 26, 1995, in Mar del Plata, Argentina. There were a total number of ten medal events, just for men.

Medal table

Medal overview

Men

See also
Weightlifting at the 1996 Summer Olympics

References
 Sports 123
 

Pan American Games
Events at the 1995 Pan American Games
1995